"Down on the Street" is a 1984 song by British band Shakatak. The song is about the joy of nightlife. It was a hit, reaching No. 9 in the UK.

It was also their only chart entry on the U.S. Dance Charts, with no further hits there, although their duet with Al Jarreau on "Day by Day" in 1985 was a mild success.

Shakatak also reworked the song for the opening titles of 1986 BBC Education series You Are What You Eat.

The song has been covered by Norwegian band D'Sound and Rage Against The Machine in 2000, on their covers album Renegades.

Track listing 
7" single
 "Down on the Street" 3:16	
 "Holding On" 4:35

12" single
 "Down on the Street" 6:48	
 "Dark Is the Night" 6:05

Charts

References 

1984 singles
Jazz-funk songs
Polydor Records singles
1984 songs
PolyGram singles
Songs written by Bill Sharpe (musician)